"Every Victory" is a song performed by Nashville-based contemporary worship band The Belonging Co and American singer Danny Gokey, which was released on February 5, 2021, as the second single from The Belonging Co's third live album, See the Light (2021). The song was written by Andrew Holt, Ben Cantelon, Danny Gokey, Josh Silverberg, Kari Jobe, Mitch Wong. The single was produced by Henry Seeley and Austin Davis.

"Every Victory" peaked at No. 2 on the US Hot Christian Songs chart.

Background
On February 5, 2021, The Belonging Co released "Every Victory" alongside Danny Gokey as a single. The Belonging Co described the song as "a bold declaration that we are not fighting for victory, we are worshipping from a place of victory."

Composition

Commercial performance
"Every Victory" debuted at No. 40 on the US Hot Christian Songs chart dated February 20, 2021, concurrently charting at No. 25 on the Christian Digital Song Sales chart. It went on to peak at No. 29 on the Hot Christian Songs chart, and spent a total of three non-consecutive weeks on Hot Christian Songs Chart.

Music video
On February 5, 2021, The Belonging Co released the official music video for "Every Victory" featuring Danny Gokey leading the song live at The Belonging Co Conference in Nashville, Tennessee.

Personnel
Adapted from AllMusic.
 The Belonging Co – primary artist
 Austin Davis – producer
 Sam Gibson – mastering engineer, mixing
 Danny Gokey – primary artist, vocals
 Henry Seeley – producer

Charts

Release history

References

External links
 

2021 songs
2021 singles
Danny Gokey songs